The Members of 14th Legislative Assembly of Maharashtra were elected in the 2019 Maharashtra Legislative Assembly election, with results announced on 21 October 2019.

The majority needed to form the government is 145 seats in the assembly of 288 MLAs. The incumbent BJP Shiv Sena alliance crossed the majority of 145 seats needed in the assembly by winning a total of 161 seats in the alliance. Individually BJP won 105 and SHS won 56 seats. The Opposition INC-NCP Alliance with 106 seats did not reach the majority mark. Individually INC won 44 and NCP won 54 seats. Due to differences in power sharing arrangement, 2019 Maharashtra political crisis ensued and Shiv Sena refused to support the newly sworned BJP CM. BJP did not prove majority in assembly. Shivsena and BJP split from their alliance.

Shiv Sena formed post-poll alliance with the Congress-NCP thus gaining majority of 172. The new alliance was named Maha Vikas Aghadi. 
Shiv Sena President Uddhav Thackeray was sworn is as the 19th Chief Minister of Maharashtra. BJP became the principal opposition party in Maharashtra.

On 21 June 2022, Eknath Shinde, a senior Shiv Sena leader, along with several other MLAs of the  Maha Vikas Aghadi moved to Surat, Gujarat throwing the coalition into a crisis.

History

Election results

The results of the 2019 Maharashtra Legislative Assembly election were announced on 21 October 2019. The majority needed to form the government is 145 seats in the assembly of 288 MLAs. The incumbent Bharatiya Janata Party Shiv Sena alliance crossed the majority of 145 seats needed in the assembly by winning a total of 161 seats in the alliance. Individually BJP won 105 and SHS won 56 seats. The Opposition INC-NCP Alliance with 106 seats did not reach the majority mark. Individually INC won 44 and NCP won 54 seats.

After the declaration of election results, Shiv Sena declined to support the BJP to form the government, demanding an equal share in power which was promised by BJP. Shiv Sena also demanded the post of Chief Minister for 2.5 years according to 50-50 promise. But BJP declined such promise and eventually ended breaking ties with one of their oldest ally Shiv Sena.

On 8 November 2019, the Governor of Maharashtra Bhagat Singh Koshyari, a BJP appointee, invited the BJP to form a government as the single largest party. However, the BJP declined to form the government on 10 November because it was unable to attain the required number to prove majority. The invitation passed to the second largest party, Shiv Sena, to form government. On 11 November, the Governor invited the NCP to form government. The next day, after the NCP also failed to gain majority support, the governor recommended president's rule to the Council of Ministers of India and the President. This was accepted, and president's rule was imposed.

BJP government formation 
In the early hours of 23 November, the president's rule was revoked and BJP's Devendra Fadnavis was sworn in as Chief Minister for a second consecutive term, while NCP leader Ajit Pawar was sworn in as Deputy Chief Minister. On the other side, NCP chief Sharad Pawar announced that Ajit Pawar's decision to support the BJP was his own and not endorsed by the party. The NCP split into two factions: one led by Sharad Pawar and the other led by his nephew Ajit Pawar. Later in the day, Ajit Pawar was removed as the parliamentary party leader of the NCP. He clarified that, despite joining hands with BJP, he is an NCP worker and will remain so. The next day Shiv Sena, the NCP, and the INC petitioned the Supreme Court regarding the discretion of the state governor to invite BJP to form government. Shiv Sena also requested the Supreme Court order the new government to prove majority in the legislative assembly. On 26 November, the Supreme Court ordered the new government to prove the majority in the legislative assembly by the evening of the next day. The same day, Ajit Pawar and Fadnavis resigned as Deputy Chief Minister and Chief Minister.

Shiv Sena, the NCP, and the INC rounded up their MLAs after Fadnavis' oath and kept them sequestered in various hotels and buses to prevent horse-trading.

MVA government formation 

The discussions between Shiv Sena, NCP and INC ended with the formation of a new alliance, Maha Vikas Aghadi. A consensus was finally achieved with Shiv Sena's Uddhav Thackeray appointed Chief Minister after protracted negotiations.

The Maha Vikas Aghadi (MVA); a post-election alliance of Shiv Sena, NCP and INC with other small parties such as the Samajwadi Party and Peasants and Workers Party of India staked the claim to form a new government under the chief ministership of Uddhav Thackeray. The MVA leaders met the governor and submitted a letter of support of MLAs of MVA. Thackeray was sworn-in as the 19th Chief Minister of Maharashtra on 28 November 2019 at Shivaji Park in Mumbai.

On 30 November, Thackeray passed floor test with 169 votes in favour. It needed to show a majority of 145 MLAs. On 1 December, Nana Patole from INC elected Speaker unopposed after BJP withdrew its candidature. Thackeray ministry had 41 members.

2022 political crisis 

On 10 June, the infighting in the Shiv Sena got highlighted for the first time when BJP won 3 out of 6 seats in Rajya Sabha elections. On 20 June 2022, BJP won all 5 seats it contested in the Maharashtra Legislative Council elections reportedly due to cross voting by several Shiv Sena members.

Immediately after the MLC election results,  11 MLAs of the Shiv Sena, led by senior Shiv Sena leader Eknath Shinde, moved to a Hotel in Surat Gujarat. Soon Shinde claimed that he commands support of 40 MLAs. These MLAs were again moved to Guwahati, Assam on 22 June. INC and NCP leaders criticized Himanta Biswa Sarma, CM of Assam, for interfering in Maharashtra politics instead of focusing on the Rain-caused flood in Assam. On other hand Mr. Sarma maintained that how he can deny entry of any Indian citizen in his state. Shinde required support of 37 MLAs to avoid being disqualified under the Anti-defection laws in India. Shinde demanded Thackeray to break the Maha Vikas Aghadi and re-join the alliance with BJP.

After failing to convince Shinde to return to Mumbai, on 22 June, Uddhav Thackeray, declared that he is ready to step down as the leader of the alliance and as Chief Minister. Later that day, Uddhav Thackeray moved from the residence of the CM Varsha to his private residence Matoshree.

On 23 June, Shinde and 37 MLAs declared Shinde as the leader of the Shiv Sena legislature party. Total rebel MLAs rose to 46 members.

Office bearers

Membership by party 

Members of Maharashtra Legislative Assembly by their political party:

Members of Legislative Assembly

References 

Maharashtra
 
Maharashtra Legislature